Michael J. McCormack (born ca.1946) is a former member of the Boston City Council, having held an at-large seat from 1982 through 1991.

Career
McCormack was first elected to the City Council in November 1981 (when the council consisted of nine members, all at-large) and was subsequently re-elected to four two-year terms (when the council consisted of four at-large members and nine district representatives). He announced in March 1991 that he would not seek re-election; his seat was won by former Boston School Committee member John A. Nucci in the November 1991 election.

A native of the Allston–Brighton neighborhood of Boston, McCormack graduated from Catholic Memorial High School in West Roxbury.
McCormack earned a bachelor's degree in education from the University of Massachusetts Boston in 1969, and a law degree from Suffolk University in 1972. He served as an Assistant Attorney General and as a Special Assistant Attorney General for the Commonwealth of Massachusetts. As of February 2018, he practices for the Boston law firm McCormack Suny LLC.

Personal life
In 1983, Michael married his wife, Sheila, in Vail, Colorado. Together they have a daughter, Hallie, and a son, Conor.

See also
 Boston City Council election, 1983
 Boston City Council election, 1985
 Boston City Council election, 1987
 Boston City Council election, 1989

References

Further reading
  (advertisement)

External links
 All About Boston: Tom Keady and Michael McCormack at Boston Neighborhood Network
 Michael McCormack & Tom Keady - Politics (Mar. 24, 2015) via YouTube

Living people
People from Allston–Brighton
Suffolk University alumni
20th century in Boston
20th-century American politicians
Boston City Council members
Massachusetts lawyers
Year of birth missing (living people)
Catholic Memorial School alumni
University of Massachusetts Boston alumni